Gabriela Vařeková (born 18 June 1987) is a Czech rower. She competed at the 2008 Summer Olympics in Beijing with the women's double sculls where they came sixth.

References

1987 births
Living people
Czech female rowers
Olympic rowers of the Czech Republic
Rowers at the 2008 Summer Olympics
People from Šternberk
European Rowing Championships medalists
Sportspeople from the Olomouc Region